Fabrizio Serbelloni (Sorbelloni) (1695–1775) was an Italian diplomat and Cardinal.

Life
Fabrizio Serbelloni was born on 4 November 1695 in Milan to a noble and prominent family. He studied initially in Rome at the Collegio Clementino, and on 18 March 1714 he received in Milan the tonsure, becoming a cleric. He followed his studies at the University of Pavia, and he graduated in utroque iure on 19 July 1718.

On 27 August 1721 he was made Referendary of the Tribunals of the Apostolic Signature of Justice and of Grace and he started his rapid career in the administration of the Papal States with the appointment as vice-legato (i.e. vice-governor) of Ferrara from 1722 to 1725. Then he served as inquisitor general in Malta from 7 May 1726 until 1730: his ministry in Malta ended after a clash with some young knights of Malta who threw him in the ditch of the old city. On 17 October 1730 he became governor of Loreto.

In 1731 he started his diplomatic career with the appointment on 12 December to the Nunciature to Florence. In preparation to this task he was elected titular archbishop of Patras on 6 August 1731 when he was still in Loreto. His episcopal consecration followed on 25 August in the Basilica della Santa Casa at the hands of Vincenzo Antonio Maria Muscettola bishop of Recanati e Loreto.

On 18 March 1735 he was appointed Apostolic Nuncio to Cologne, followed by the Nunciature to Poland starting from 28 July 1738. His last diplomatic post was the appointment as Nuncio to the Emperor in Vienna which he kept for about eight years, from 5 March 1746 to 4 June 1754. During his office in Vienna, he did not succeed in protecting the interests of the Papacy in relation to some disputed feuds.

On 26 November 1653 he was promoted to Cardinal priest with the title of Santo Stefano al Monte Celio, which on 21 March 1763 he modified to the title of Santa Maria in Trastevere. He returned to his career as officer of the Papal States being appointed legate (i.e. governor) of Bologna on 16 September 1754, a position he maintained till October 1761.

He became Cardinal Bishop of Albano on 16 May 1763, and Cardinal Bishop of Ostia on 18 April 1774. He died in Rome on 7 December 1775, and he was buried in the church of San Carlo al Corso in front of the main altar.

Notes

References

1695 births
1775 deaths
University of Pavia alumni
Clergy from Milan
18th-century Italian cardinals
Latin archbishops of Patras
Apostolic Nuncios to the Republic of Florence
Apostolic Nuncios to Cologne
Apostolic Nuncios to Poland
Apostolic Nuncios to Austria
Cardinal-bishops of Albano
Cardinal-bishops of Ostia
Inquisitors of Malta
Diplomats from Milan